Taipei City Bank Football Club was a Taiwanese football club playing in Chinese Taipei National Football League. It was dissolved in 2000 as Taipei City Bank turned into a private entity.

Achievements
 National First Division Football League (now Enterprise Football League)
 Winners (3): 1986, 1989, 1991
 Runners-up (5): 1983, 1985, 1990, 1994, 1998

2000 disestablishments in Taiwan
Football clubs in Taiwan
Defunct sports teams in Taiwan
Association football clubs disestablished in 2000
Financial services association football clubs in Taiwan